The 347th Bombardment Squadron is an inactive United States Air Force unit.  It was last assigned to the 4047th Strategic Wing.  It was inactivated at McCoy Air Force Base, Florida on 1 April 1963.

During World War II, the 347th Bombardment Squadron was a B-17 Flying Fortress squadron, assigned to the 99th Bombardment Group, Fifteenth Air Force. It earned two Distinguished Unit Citations.

History

World War II
The squadron was established in early 1942 as a B-17 Flying Fortress heavy bombardment squadron. It first trained under the Second Air Force in the Pacific Northwest, but the poor flying weather forced a relocation to the Midwest for the second and third phases of training.

After completion of training, the 99th departed for the Mediterranean Theater of Operations (MTO) in Algeria, where the ground echelon went by ship from New York City to Marrakech, Morocco; the air echelon flying to Morrison Field, Florida then along the South Atlantic Route to Navarin Airfield, Algeria where the ground and air echelons of the group were reunited in late February 1943.  Assigned to Twelfth Air Force, the squadron engaged in combat operations in support of American ground forces in Algeria and Tunisia during the 1943 North African campaign.

They helped force the capitulation of Pantelleria Island in June 1943, and bombed in preparation for and in support of the invasions of Sicily and southern Italy in the summer and fall of 1943.  The squadron was reassigned to the new Fifteenth Air Force in October 1943 and until the German Capitulation in May 1945, they engaged in strategic bombardment of enemy targets in Italy, France, Germany, Czechoslovakia, Austria, Hungary, Romania, Bulgaria, Yugoslavia, and Greece, attacking oil refineries, marshaling yards, aircraft factories, and other strategic objectives. It was demobilized in Italy in late 1945, and inactivated in November.

Air Force reserve
The unit was activated in the reserves in 1947; however, it was never fully equipped or manned, and was inactivated in 1949 due to budget restraints.

Strategic Air Command
The squadron was reactivated in January 1953 at Fairchild Air Force Base, Washington when the 111th Strategic Reconnaissance Wing, an Air National Guard unit that had been mobilized for the Korean War, was returned to state control.  The squadron assumed the mission, personnel, and Convair RB-36 Peacemaker strategic reconnaissance aircraft of the 111th Wing's 129th Strategic Reconnaissance Squadron, a regular unit assigned to the 111th Wing, which was simultaneously inactivated.  Engaged in worldwide strategic bombardment training and stood nuclear alert until 1956 when the B-36 was retired.  

In 1961 it was assigned to SAC's 4047th Strategic Wing and re-equipped with B-52D Stratofortress intercontinental heavy bombers, then reassigned to McCoy AFB, Florida by SAC to disperse its heavy bomber force.  The squadron conducted worldwide strategic bombardment training missions and providing nuclear deterrent. It was finally inactivated in 1963 when SAC inactivated its provisional Strategic Wings, redesignating them permanent Air Force Wings. The squadron was inactivated, with aircraft, personnel, and equipment being redesignated 367th Bombardment Squadron in an in-place, name-only transfer.

Lineage

 Constituted 347th Bombardment Squadron (Heavy) on 28 January 1942
 Activated on 1 June 1942
 Inactivated on 8 November 1945
 Re-designated 347th Bombardment Squadron (Very Heavy) on 13 May 1947
 Activated in the reserve on 29 May 1947
 Inactivated on 27 June 1949
 Re-designated 347th Strategic Reconnaissance Squadron (Heavy), and activated, on 1 January 1953.
 Re-designated 347th Bombardment Squadron (Heavy) on 1 October 1955
 Discontinued, and inactivated on 1 April 1963; personnel/aircraft/equipment redesignated as 367th Bombardment Squadron

Assignments
 99th Bombardment Group, 1 June 1942 – 8 November 1945; 29 May 1947 – 27 Jun 1949
 99th Strategic Reconnaissance (later Bombardment) Wing, 1 January 1953
 4047th Strategic Wing, 1 September 1961 – 1 April 1963

Stations

 Orlando AAB, Florida, 1 June 1942
 MacDill Field, Florida, 1 June 1942
 Pendleton Field, Oregon, 29 June 1942
 Gowen Field, Idaho, 28 August 1942
 Walla Walla AAFld, Washington, 30 September 1942
 Sioux City AAB, Iowa, 18 November 1942 – 3 January 1943
 Navarin Airfield, Algeria 22 February 1943 – 25 March 1943

 Oudna Airfield, Tunisia, 4 August 1943
 Tortorella Airfield, Italy, 11 December 1943
 Marcianise Airfield, Italy, c. 27 October – 8 November 1945
 Birmingham Municipal Airport, Alabama, 29 May 1947 – 27 June 1949.
 Fairchild AFB, Washington, 1 January 1953
 Westover AFB, Massachusetts, 4 September 1956
 McCoy Air Force Base, Florida, 1 September 1961 – 1 April 1963

Aircraft
 B-17 Flying Fortress, 1942–1945
 B/RB-36 Peacemaker, 1953–1956
 B-52D Stratofortress, 1956–1963

See also

 Boeing B-17 Flying Fortress Units of the Mediterranean Theater of Operations
 List of B-52 Units of the United States Air Force

References

 Maurer, Maurer (1983). Air Force Combat Units of World War II. Maxwell AFB, AL: Office of Air Force History. .

External links

Military units and formations established in 1942
Bombardment squadrons of the United States Air Force
Bombardment squadrons of the United States Army Air Forces